is a Japanese manga series written by Yabako Sandrovich and illustrated by Daromeon. It was serialized on Shogakukan's Ura Sunday website from April 2012 to August 2018, with its chapters compiled into twenty-seven tankōbon volumes. A sequel, titled Kengan Omega, began in January 2019. It was adapted into an original net animation (ONA) anime series. The first 12-episode part premiered in July 2019 through Netflix. The second 12-episode part premiered in October 2019. A second season is set to premiere in 2023.

Summary
Since the Edo period of Japan, gladiator arenas have existed in various forms around the world. In these arenas, wealthy business owners and merchants hire gladiators to fight in unarmed combat where the winner takes all, called Kengan matches. Yamashita Kazuo, an average Japanese salaryman for Nogi Group witnesses a street fight in an alley between two mysterious fighters. One of the fighters, Tokita "Ashura" Ohma is scouted out by the Nogi Group CEO, Nogi Hideki, due to defeating their previous fighter in the street fight. Kazuo is roped into managing Ohma who joins these arenas only to devastate his opponents. His spectacular ability to crush his enemies catches the attention of big business owners, leading to his inclusion in the Kengan Annihilation Tournament under the invitation of Hideki. This tournament is held by the biggest CEOs in Japan and the winner gets the seat of Kengan Association chairman, a position which holds immense power and prestige. As the tournament unfolds Ohma tests his strength while struggling with his mysterious past coming back to haunt him as Kazuo struggles with managing Ohma and figuring out the true intentions as to why he was invited to this tournament.

Characters

A fighter in his late 20s. After defeating another fighter in a dark alley one night, a representative of the Nogi Group for the Kengan Association, he was picked by the Nogi group to be its new representative with Kazuo Yamashita as his caretaker. The bond between these two individuals begins as they participate in the Kengan matches, and later taking part in the Kengan Annihilation Tournament. Nicknamed "Ashura" in the Kengan matches. 

A 56-year old salaryman of the Nogi Group. After a fateful encounter with Ohma Tokita, he was reassigned to be Ohma's caretaker by order of the Nogi Group's CEO. Skittish and meek, something awakens inside of him as he ventures deeper into the Kengan matches, as well as his bond with Ohma. Later made President of the Yamashita Trading Co., a shell company of the Nogi Group. 

CEO of the Nogi Group. He challenges the Kengan Association for the position of Chairman, resulting in the creation of the Annihilation Tournament with a stipulation that, if the Nogi Group fails to win, the company is dissolved and taken by the Kengan Association. He forms the shell company Yamashita Trading Co., with Kazuo Yamashita as its President and Ohma Tokita as its representative fighter. He also formed a 2nd shell company SF Cold Storage with Lihito as both its President and fighter.

Hideki Nogi's personal secretary, later assigned to help Kazuo and Ohma as they proceed into the tournament.
 

Nicknamed "The Superhuman". Ohma's 2nd opponent in the Kengan matches initially on behalf of Yoshitake Real Estate. He was later made the head of a shell company SF Cold Storage by Hideki Nogi, making him the first president/fighter in the tournament's history. His name comes from his technique where his fingers are sharp enough to cut through flesh. His real name is Ichiro Nakata.

A pro wrestler representing the company Gandai. Nicknamed "Hell's Angel".

Specializing in Brazilian Jiu-Jitsu, he is the youngest fighter in the Kengan Annihilation tournament. He represents Nishihonji Security Services. Nicknamed "The King of Stranglers". 

A fighter for the Koyo Academy Group. His insane attraction to Ohma has driven him to kill his own master, who murdered Ohma's master prior to the start of the series. He enters the tournament in the hopes of fighting Ohma and to be killed by him as his ultimate form of affection.

Media

Manga
Kengan Ashura is written by Yabako Sandrovich and illustrated by Daromeon. It was serialized in Shogakukan's online platform Ura Sunday and in the MangaONE app from April 18, 2012 to August 9, 2018. Shogakukan collected its chapters in twenty-seven tankōbon volumes, released from December 18, 2012 to February 19, 2019.

A sequel, titled , began its serialization on Ura Sunday and MangaONE on January 17, 2019. The sequel is set two years after the events of the original series. Shogakukan has collected its chapters into individual tankōbon volumes. The first volume was released on February 19, 2019. As of September 16, 2021, ten volumes have been released.

Both series are licensed digitally in North America by Comikey.

Volume list

Kengan Ashura

Kengan Omega

Anime
Ura Sunday opened a fan poll in January 2015 to let fans decide which of their series should receive an anime adaptation. In May 2015, it was announced that Kengan Ashura had won the poll with 2.3 million out of 9 million total votes, and would be adapted into an anime. Two years later, on December 7, 2017, it was announced that the anime was still being planned, with the 23rd volume revealing on December 12, 2017 that the anime would be a television series. The staff and release window for the series were announced on March 22, 2018. The series was directed by Seiji Kishi and written by Makoto Uezu, with animation by Larx Entertainment. Kazuaki Morita provided character designs for the anime, while Yasuharu Takanashi composed the series' music. The world premiere of the series took place at Anime Expo on July 7, 2018. The series premiered in Japan at Toho Cinemas Roppongi Hills on January 27, 2019. The series premiered on July 31, 2019. The opening theme is "King & Ashley" by My First Story, while the ending theme is "Born This Way" by BAD HOP. Netflix streamed the anime. The second part of the series, also consisting of 12 episodes, premiered on Netflix on October 31, 2019.

On March 24, 2022, it was announced that the anime is receiving a sequel. The editor of Kengan Omega manga has confirmed on Twitter that the anime continuation will adapt the original manga’s story “until the end of the original (the end of the tournament)!” It was later revealed to be a second season that is set to premiere in 2023.

Episode list

Other media
A drama CD was bundled with the special edition of volume 0 on January 8, 2016.

In July 2020, a crossover art by Daromeon and Keisuke Itagaki, featuring Ohma Tokita and Baki Hanma from Baki the Grappler, was drawn to promote both series availability on Netflix.

Sandrovich launched another manga series, titled How Heavy Are the Dumbbells You Lift?, which is set in the same universe as Kengan Ashura.

References

External links
  
  
 

2019 anime ONAs
Anime series based on manga
Japanese webcomics
Japanese-language Netflix original programming
Larx Entertainment
Martial arts anime and manga
Netflix original anime
Shōnen manga
Shogakukan manga
Webcomics in print